Beverly Beach may refer to:

 Beverly Beach, Florida
 Beverley Beach, Maryland
 Beverly Beach, Oregon
 Beverly Beach State Park in Oregon